The coat of arms of the Georgian Soviet Socialist Republic was adopted on May 20, 1921 by the government of the Georgian Soviet Socialist Republic. The coat of arms is loosely based on the coat of arms of the Soviet Union. It shows symbols of agriculture (grapes and wheat). The red star rising above the Caucasus stands for the future of the Georgian nation, and the hammer and sickle for the victory of Communism and the "world-wide socialist community of states".

The banner bears the Soviet Union state motto ("Workers of the world, unite!") in both the Georgian and Russian languages. In Georgian, it is "პროლეტარებო ყველა ქვეყნისა, შეერთდით!" (transliterated: "P’rolet’arebo q’vela kveq’nisa, sheertdit!").

The Abkhaz Autonomous Soviet Socialist Republic and the Adjar Autonomous Soviet Socialist Republic used variants of this coat of arms (in the Abkhaz case, with the name of the republic and the motto also in Abkhaz).

A later version in 1981 introduced an inscription reading "საქ.სსრ" (Georgian abbreviation for "Georgian Soviet Socialist Republic") in the centre of the field.

This coat of arms was replaced by a new one on December 11, 1990.

History

First revision 
The Revolutionary Committee of the SSR of Georgia twice, at its meetings, on March 8 and May 15, 1921, raised the question of the coat of arms. On May 20, 1921, the Revolutionary Committee of the SSR adopted a decree "On the arms and flag of the Socialist Soviet Republic of Georgia":

The coat of arms is reconfirmed in the Constitution of the Georgian SSR, adopted by the Fourth All-Georgian Congress of Soviets of Workers, Peasants' and Red Army Deputies in 1927, the coat of arms is described in Article 112:

Second revision 

In the opinion of the commission set up in 1937 under the Presidium of the Supreme Soviet of the USSR, it was necessary to add the name of the republic to the coat of arms of the Georgian SSR, to introduce a red five-pointed star, and to represent citrus and tea between the ears and grapevines. Apparently, it was then recommended to remove from the coat of arms the motto "Proletarians of all countries, unite!" In French.

According to V. Potseluev's book Emblems of the USSR, on February 13, 1937, the Extraordinary VIII Congress of Soviets of the Georgian SSR adopted a new Constitution of the Georgian SSR, in which the arms were described as follows: 

On February 6, 1956, the Decree of the Presidium of the Supreme Council of the Georgian SSR approved the "Regulations on the State Emblem of the Georgian SSR".

Third revision 
On April 15, 1978, the Supreme Soviet of the Georgian SSR adopted a new Constitution of the Georgian SSR. 

On June 18, 1981, in a new version of the "Regulations on the State Emblem of the Georgian SSR", the abbreviation "GSSR" was added to the emblem.

Gallery

References

Georgian SSR
Georgian Soviet Socialist Republic
Georgian SSR
Georgian SSR
Georgian SSR
Georgian SSR
Georgian SFSR
Georgian SSR
Georgian SSR